Geetha is a 1981 Indian Kannada-language romantic drama film directed by and starring Shankar Nag in lead, alongside Akshatha Rao in title role. The supporting cast features K. S. Ashwath, Ramesh Bhat and Gayathri. Ilayaraaja composed the soundtrack and the background score for the film that and was declared a blockbuster musical hit. He went on to re-use four songs from the movie in five different films later. The track "Santhoshakke" from the film became widely popular in Karnataka and is still performed for in concerts and other events.

The characterization of the lead actress from Mani Ratnam 's 1989 Telugu movie Geethanjali was reported to have been partially borrowed from this movie - the chirpy attitude with which the eponymous lead speaks and behaves - and also bore a great resemblance in terms of closure of the movie - where she breathes her last due to cancer in the climax.

Plot
Geetha (Akshatha Rao) is a college-going student, who has co-organised a charity concert in her college. Sanjay (Shankar Nag), a singer, performs at the show singing the track "Santhoshakke". Floored by his performance and good looks, she pursues him. A university champion in badminton, she invites him to her club to play, with an intention to get closer to him and succeeds. However, Geetha suffers from an illness, the symptoms of which is seen in her holding her neck tight and screaming. Her father Srinivas (K. S. Ashwath) suffers from a heart ailment. Following another of Sanjay's concert, she confesses her love to him. He, however fails to remember her every time, and eventually, falls in love with her.

Upon diagnosis, it is revealed to Geetha's mother, Dr. Mukta (Sowcar Janaki) that she suffers from blood cancer, which is not revealed to her father and her. Eager to learn to drive a car, Geetha pesters Sanjay. Sanjay flusters every time she asks him, and finally reveals to her about his ex-girlfriend Sunanda, who succumbed as a brake-failed vehicle she was driving exploded. Deciding to get married, Sanjay speaks to Geetha's mother, when she reveals to him of the latter's illness. The illness takes a toll on Geetha's eyes and loses her eyesight among other visible bodily wounds.
Sanjay, with the help of Dr. Rudrappa (Lohithashwa) gets an Interferon drug, an alleged cure of cancer, imported from California. He collects it from the airport and Geetha breathes her last by the time he arrives at her house with the drug.

Cast
 Shankar Nag as Sanjay
 Akshatha Rao as Geetha
 K. S. Ashwath as Srinivas
 Sowcar Janaki as Mukta
 Ramesh Bhat as Satish
 Gayatri as Sunanda
 Shyamala
 Shivaram as Linganna
 Mandeep Roy as Hanumantha
 Tiger Prabhakar as an astrologer
 Lohithaswa as Doctor Rudrappa
 Hanumanthachar
 Kunigal Ramanath
 Sunali (credited as Baby Sunali)

Soundtrack

Ilayaraaja composed the background score for the film and the soundtracks, and lyrics were written by Chi. Udaya Shankar. The album consists of six soundtracks. Ilayaraja later adapted the track "Jotheyali" as "Vizhiyile Mani" for Nooravathu Naal and also as "Jaane Do Na" for the 2007 Hindi film Cheeni Kum. "Nanna Jeeva" was adapted as "Devan Thandha Veenai" for Unnai Naan Santhithen. "Kelade" was adapted as "Devathai Ilam Devi" for Aayiram Nilave Vaa. The song "Santhoshakke" was adapted as "Adichikko Site Adichikko [Othamal Oru Nalum]" for the film Kairasikkaran.

References

External links 
 

1981 films
1980s Kannada-language films
Films scored by Ilaiyaraaja
1981 romantic drama films
Indian romantic drama films
Films directed by Shankar Nag